Megalolaelaps is a small genus of mites in the order Mesostigmata, placed in its own family, Megalolaelapidae.  Two species are recognised:
 Megalolaelaps haeros (Berlese, 1888)
 Megalolaelaps ornatus (Keegan, 1946)

References

Mesostigmata